Low Rock Castle was a listed building  in Portstewart in County Londonderry, Northern Ireland.

History
The house, which was originally battlemented, was completed around 1820.  In 1835 it became the birthplace of Field Marshal Sir George White VC, who commanded the garrison at the Siege of Ladysmith during the Second Boer War.

References

Sources
 
 

Castles in County Londonderry
Portstewart